Mildred Elizabeth Gillars (November 29, 1900 – June 25, 1988) was an American broadcaster employed by Nazi Germany to disseminate Axis propaganda during World War II. Following her capture in post-war Berlin, she became the first woman to be convicted of treason against the United States. In March 1949, she was sentenced to ten to thirty years' imprisonment. She was released in 1961. Along with Rita Zucca she was nicknamed "Axis Sally".

Early life
Born Mildred Elizabeth Sisk in Portland, Maine, she took the surname Gillars in 1911 after her mother remarried. Her family resided in Bellevue, Ohio where her father was a dentist.  At 16, she moved to Conneaut, Ohio with her family. In 1918, she enrolled at Ohio Wesleyan University to study dramatic arts, but left without graduating.
 
Gillars then moved to Greenwich Village, New York City, where she worked in various low-skilled jobs to finance drama lessons. She toured with stock companies and appeared in vaudeville but she was unable to establish a theatrical career. Gillars also worked as an artist's model for sculptor Mario Korbel but was unable to find regular employment. In 1929, she moved to France and lived in Paris for six months.

In 1933, Gillars left the United States again, residing first in Algiers where she found work as a dressmaker's assistant. In 1934, she moved to Dresden, Germany to study music and was later employed as a teacher of English at the Berlitz School of Languages in Berlin.

Work as a Nazi propagandist
In 1940, Gillars obtained work as an announcer with the Reichs-Rundfunk-Gesellschaft (RRG), German State Radio.

By 1941, the U.S. State Department was advising American nationals to leave Germany and German-controlled territories. However, Gillars chose to remain because her fiancé, Paul Karlson who was a naturalized German citizen, said he would never marry her if she returned to the United States. Shortly afterwards, Karlson was sent to aid the German war effort in the Eastern Front where he was killed in action.

Gillars' initial broadcasts were largely apolitical. Eventually, she started a relationship with Max Otto Koischwitz, the German-American program director in the USA Zone at the RRG. In 1942, Koischwitz cast Gillars in a new show called Home Sweet Home and included her in his political broadcasts. Gillars soon acquired several names amongst her GI audience, including the "Bitch of Berlin", "Berlin Babe", "Olga", and "Sally", but the most common was "Axis Sally". This name probably came when asked on air to describe herself, Gillars said she was "the Irish type… a real Sally." Gillars expressed anti-Semitic sentiments during her broadcasts. During one broadcast, she said "I say damn Roosevelt and Churchill, and all of their Jews who have made this war possible."
 
In 1943, an Italian-American woman, Rita Zucca, also began broadcasting to American forces from Rome using the name "Sally". The two often were confused with each other and even thought by many to be one and the same, though Gillars was annoyed another woman was broadcasting under her name.

Gillars' main programs from Berlin were:

Home Sweet Home Hour, from December 24, 1942 until 1945, a regular propaganda program aimed at making U.S. forces in Europe feel homesick. A running theme of these broadcasts was the infidelity of soldiers' wives and sweethearts while the listeners were stationed in Europe and North Africa. She questioned whether the women would remain faithful, "especially if you boys get all mutilated and do not return in one piece". Opening with the sound of a train whistle, Home Sweet Home attempted to exploit the fears of American soldiers about the home front. The broadcasts were designed to make soldiers feel doubt about their mission, their leaders, and their prospects after the war. 
Midge at the Mike, broadcast from March to late fall 1943, in which she played American songs interspersed with defeatist propaganda, anti-Semitic rhetoric, and attacks on Franklin D. Roosevelt.
GI's Letter-box and Medical Reports (1944), directed at the U.S. home audience in which Gillars used information on wounded and captured U.S. airmen to cause fear and worry in their families. After D-Day (June 6, 1944), Gillars and Koischwitz worked for a time from Chartres and Paris for this purpose, visiting hospitals and interviewing POWs, falsely claiming to be a representative of the International Red Cross. In 1943, they had toured POW camps in Germany, interviewing captured Americans and recording their messages for their families in the U.S. The interviews were then edited for broadcast as though the speakers were well-treated or sympathetic to the Nazi cause.

Gillars made her most famous broadcast on May 11, 1944, a few weeks prior to the D-Day invasion of Normandy, in a radio play written by Koischwitz called Vision of Invasion. She played Evelyn, an Ohio mother, who dreams that her son had died a horrific death on a ship in the English Channel during an attempted invasion of Occupied Europe.
 
Koischwitz died in August 1944 and Gillars' broadcasts became lackluster and repetitive without his creative energy. She remained in Berlin until the end of the war. Her last broadcast was on May 6, 1945, just two days before the surrender of Germany.

Arrest, trial, and imprisonment
The U.S. attorney general dispatched prosecutor Victor C. Woerheide to Berlin to find and arrest Gillars. He and Counterintelligence Corps special agent Hans Winzen only had one solid lead: Raymond Kurtz, a B-17 pilot shot down by the Germans, recalled that a woman who had visited his prison camp seeking interviews was the broadcaster who called herself "Midge at the Mike", and had used the alias Barbara Mome. Woerheide organized wanted posters with Gillars' picture to put up in Berlin, and the breakthrough came when he was informed that a woman calling herself "Barbara Mome" was selling her furniture at second-hand markets around the city. A shop owner whose stock contained a table belonging to Gillars was detained and under "intensive interrogation" revealed Gillars' address. When she was arrested on March 15, 1946, Gillars only asked to take with her a picture of Koischwitz.

She was then held by the Counterintelligence Corps at Camp King, Oberursel, along with collaborators Herbert John Burgman and Donald S. Day, until she was conditionally released from custody on December 24, 1946; however, she declined to leave military detention. She was abruptly re-arrested on January 22, 1947 after being offered conditional release by the United States of America at the request of the Justice Department and was eventually flown to the United States on August 21, 1948 to await trial on charges of aiding the German war effort.

Gillars was indicted on September 10, 1948 and charged with ten counts of treason, but only eight were used at her trial which began on January 25, 1949. The prosecution relied on the large number of her programs recorded by the Federal Communications Commission, stationed in Silver Hill, Maryland, to show her active participation in propaganda activities directed at the United States. It was also shown that Gillars had taken an oath of allegiance to Adolf Hitler. The defense stated that her broadcasts stated unpopular opinions but did not amount to treasonable conduct. They also argued that she was under the hypnotic influence of Koischwitz and therefore not fully responsible for her actions until after his death. On March 10, 1949, the jury convicted Gillars on just one count of treason, that of making the Vision of Invasion broadcast. She was sentenced to 10 to 30 years in prison and a $10,000 fine. The judge spared Gillars from a harsher sentence since she had not participated in high-level Nazi propaganda policy conferences as was the case with Douglas Chandler and Robert Henry Best. In 1950, the U.S. Court of Appeals for the District of Columbia upheld the conviction.

Gillars served her sentence at the Federal Reformatory for Women in Alderson, West Virginia. She became eligible for parole in 1959, but did not apply until 1961. She was released on June 10, 1961.

Later life
Having converted to Catholicism while in prison, Gillars went to live at the Our Lady of Bethlehem Convent in Columbus, Ohio and taught German, French, and music at St. Joseph Academy, Columbus.

In 1973, she returned to Ohio Wesleyan University to complete her degree, a Bachelor of Arts in speech.

Gillars died of colon cancer at Grant Medical Center in Columbus on June 25, 1988.

Film
Gillars' wartime broadcasts and trial are the subject of the 2021 legal drama American Traitor: The Trial of Axis Sally.

See also
Donald S. Day
Douglas Chandler
Herbert John Burgman
Iva Toguri D'Aquino
Jane Anderson (Nazi collaborator)
Robert Henry Best
Tokyo Rose

References

External links

The Last Archive Episode 3: The Inner Front - Jill Lepore podcast

1900 births
1988 deaths
Nazi propagandists
American women civilians in World War II
People from Portland, Maine
Radio personalities from New York City
American fascists
American collaborators with Nazi Germany
People convicted of treason against the United States
Converts to Roman Catholicism
Ohio Wesleyan University alumni
People from Conneaut, Ohio
Deaths from colorectal cancer
Deaths from cancer in Ohio
Women in Nazi Germany
Catholics from Ohio
Catholics from Maine
Radio personalities from Maine
Prisoners and detainees of the United States federal government
Prisoners and detainees of the United States military